Akeel J. Morris (born November 14, 1992) is an American professional baseball pitcher for the Long Island Ducks of the Atlantic League of Professional Baseball. He was drafted by the New York Mets in the 10th round of the 2010 Major League Baseball draft. He made his Major League Baseball (MLB) debut for the Mets in 2015. He also played in MLB for the Atlanta Braves and Los Angeles Angels.

Early life
Akeel Morris was born in Saint Thomas, U.S. Virgin Islands to Kenneth, a crane operator from Saint Kitts, and Corlette, an insurance agent from Antigua. Before he began to focus on pitching, his favorite baseball player was Derek Jeter; afterwards, it was Josh Beckett.

Morris attended Charlotte Amalie High School. In December of 2009, he pitched a perfect game, striking out all 15 batters he faced. Morris' parents paid for their son to travel to the Dominican Republic to try out for the New York Mets.

Professional career

New York Mets

Morris was drafted by the New York Mets in the 10th round of the 2010 Major League Baseball draft. He made his professional debut that season for the Gulf Coast League Mets. He appeared in eight games with six starts, going 1–1 with a 2.19 ERA and 28 strikeouts over  innings.

Morris played 2011 and 2012 with the Kingsport Mets. He played 2013 with the Brooklyn Cyclones, and was 4-1 with one save and a 1.00 ERA in 45.0 innings, and was fifth in the league with 12.0 strikeouts per 9 innings, and 10th with 5.8 hits per 9 innings.

After splitting time between starting and relieving his first four seasons, Morris became a full-time reliever for the Savannah Sand Gnats of the South Atlantic League in 2014. In a game against the Augusta GreenJackets in April, Morris struck out four batters in one inning. He finished the season 4-1--leading the league with 16 saves, a 0.63 ERA, 3.0 hits per 9 innings,  14.1 strikeouts per 9 innings, and a 0.719 WHIP—in 57 innings with 89 strikeouts over 41 appearances. He was named an SAL mid-season and post-season All Star, a 2014 MiLB Organization All Star, and a 2014 Baseball America Low Class A All Star.

Morris began the 2015 season with the St. Lucie Mets of the Class A-Advanced Florida State League (FSL), for whom he was 0-1 with a 1.69 ERA in 32.0 innings, and was a mid-season FSL All Star. He was promoted to the major leagues on June 15. He made his debut on June 18 against the Toronto Blue Jays at Rogers Centre in the eighth and allowed five runs on three hits and three walks in 2/3 of an inning; it was his one MLB appearance for the season. To make room for Logan Verrett, Morris was sent to the Binghamton Mets, for whom he was 0-1 with a 2.45 ERA in 29.1 innings. Between the two minor league teams, he allowed 4.1 hits per 9 innings, and struck out 11.9 batters per 9 innings. He was named a 2015 MiLB Organization All Star.

Atlanta Braves
On June 8, 2016, the Mets traded Morris to the Atlanta Braves for Kelly Johnson. He was assigned to AA Mississippi on the same day. On August 12, Morris was recalled by the Braves. The next day, Morris was optioned down to AA Mississippi. On July 6, 2017, Morris was promoted to the Braves major league roster. With the Braves, he was 1-0 with a 1.23 ERA in 7.1 innings. His fastball topped out at 95 miles per hour, and his best pitch was a fading change-up. Morris was designated for assignment on March 31, 2018.

Los Angeles Angels
On April 3, 2018, Morris was traded to the Los Angeles Angels in exchange for cash considerations or a player to be named later. The Angels called up Morris four days later and he pitched in the game that day. He elected free agency on November 2, 2018.

High Point Rockers
On April 1, 2019, Morris was drafted by the High Point Rockers of the Atlantic League of Professional Baseball at the 2019 ALPB Player Showcase.

New Britain Bees

On July 8, 2019, Morris was traded to the Southern Maryland Blue Crabs of the Atlantic League of Professional Baseball. On July 12, he was traded to the New Britain Bees in order to complete an earlier trade, without appearing in a game for the Blue Crabs.

Long Island Ducks
On November 6, 2019, Morris was selected by the Long Island Ducks in the New Britain Bees dispersal draft. Morris did not play in a game in 2020 due to the cancellation of the ALPB season because of the COVID-19 pandemic and became a free agent after the year. On May 17, 2021, Morris re-signed with the Ducks for the 2021 season. In three starts, he threw 14 scoreless innings and struck out 17 batters.

San Francisco Giants
On June 11, 2021, Morris's contract was purchased by the San Francisco Giants organization and he was assigned to the Double-A Richmond Flying Squirrels. He elected free agency on November 7, 2021.

Long Island Ducks (second stint)
On March 31, 2022, Morris again signed with the Long Island Ducks.

International career
Morris was selected to represent Great Britain at the 2023 World Baseball Classic qualifiers.

References

External links

 Akeel Morris stats MiLB.com

1992 births
Living people
People from Saint Thomas, U.S. Virgin Islands
Major League Baseball players from the United States Virgin Islands
Major League Baseball pitchers
African-American baseball players
New York Mets players
Atlanta Braves players
Long Island Ducks players
Los Angeles Angels players
Gulf Coast Mets players
Kingsport Mets players
Brooklyn Cyclones players
Savannah Sand Gnats players
St. Lucie Mets players
Binghamton Mets players
Mississippi Braves players
Gwinnett Braves players
Salt Lake Bees players
Cardenales de Lara players
American expatriate baseball players in Venezuela
High Point Rockers players
American expatriate baseball players in Australia
United States Virgin Islands expatriate baseball players
Great Britain
Great Britain national baseball team players
21st-century African-American sportspeople
2023 World Baseball Classic players